Osmanpur Union is a union, the smallest administrative body of Bangladesh, located in Mirsharai Upazila, Chittagong District, Bangladesh. The total population is 13,443.

References

Unions of Mirsharai Upazila